Bernard Fournet (born 13 November 1941) is a French hurdler. He competed in the men's 110 metres hurdles at the 1964 Summer Olympics.

References

External links
 

1941 births
Living people
Athletes (track and field) at the 1964 Summer Olympics
French male hurdlers
Olympic athletes of France
Sportspeople from Dreux
20th-century French people